A Fresh Aire Christmas is the tenth studio album and second Christmas album by American musical group Mannheim Steamroller, released in 1988.

The album was the last to feature Eric Hansen as a member of the band. It is the highest selling album in the Chip Davis/Mannheim Steamroller music catalog.

When selecting the tracks, Chip Davis had requested of fans to submit three of their favorite Christmas songs. He then tabulated the results and sent a note of thanks and a copy of the album to those fans who had a song selected.

On June 21, 2004, A Fresh Aire Christmas was certified by the Recording Industry Association of America for shipment of six million copies in the United States, making it one of the best-selling holiday albums in the U.S.

Four of the album's tracks were included in the group's 2004 compilation Christmas Celebration.

As of November 2014, A Fresh Aire Christmas is the sixth best-selling Christmas/holiday album in the U.S. for the Nielsen SoundScan era of music sales tracking (March 1991 – present), having sold 3,660,000 copies during this period according to SoundScan. The album has become the band's biggest success, even surpassing their first Christmas release, Mannheim Steamroller Christmas.

Track listing

References

1988 Christmas albums
Mannheim Steamroller albums
Christmas albums by American artists
American Gramaphone albums
Classical Christmas albums
New-age Christmas albums